The Citizens Bank of Vidalia in Vidalia, Georgia is listed on the National Register of Historic Places.  It is also a contributing building in the Vidalia Commercial Historic District.

It was built in c.1901 and was the first bank built in Vidalia.  The bank was founded by the town's founder, W.T. Jenkins, owner of a turpentine company.

References

External links
 

Bank buildings on the National Register of Historic Places in Georgia (U.S. state)
Buildings and structures completed in 1901
Buildings and structures in Toombs County, Georgia
National Register of Historic Places in Toombs County, Georgia